Nicrophorus quadrimaculatus is a burying beetle described by Matthews in 1888.

References

Silphidae
Beetles of North America
Beetles described in 1888